Patty Parker is an American singer, drummer, producer, and co-owner of independent record label, Comstock Records. In the mid-1970s she and her future husband, Frank Fara (Fafara) toured the Nevada casino circuit in their traveling Country music show, The Frank Fara Show featuring Patty Parker. Parker sang background vocals and was one of the only female drummers touring. In 1978, Parker and Fara launched Comstock Records and experienced immediate success with their first artist, Alex Fraser, whose single peaked at #9 on the Canadian Country music charts. Parker was one of the first full-time female music producers in Nashville and her success caught the attention of Billboard, Cashbox, Music Row Magazine, The Wall Street Journal, CNN and many local newspapers across Canada and the United States.

Early life 
Patty Parker grew up Shawnee, Kansas, just outside of Kansas City, Missouri.  Patty's father, Will Yeats, was the music director of a Baptist church and Patty grew up singing harmonies in her church choir. In college she earned her bachelor's degree in music education from John Brown University and toured the U.S. with the school's vocal gospel ensemble, the Harmonaires. After college, Parker worked as a music teacher in the Shawnee Mission School District and helped “arrange the sounds” for various school productions.  After three years of teaching, Parker moved to California to pursue her dream of becoming a singer/performer.

The Frank Fara Show featuring Patty Parker 
In California, Parker worked as a secretary for a construction company until she met songwriter and former teen idol from Phoenix, Arizona, Frank Fara. After playing a jam session with each other, the two decided to continue working together. With two other musicians (Paul Marshall/bass, Keith Johnson/lead guitar), they put together a country music road show. Fara wrote the songs and was the lead singer; Parker sang backup vocals and played the drums. The show was originally named The Frank Fara Show, but when audiences reacted enthusiastically to Parker's performances, they renamed the show, The Frank Fara Show featuring Patty Parker.

For five years, their show toured the Nevada casino circuit and venues across the U.S. and Canada. While on tour, Parker and Fara visited local radio stations to share their latest singles and to create relationships with disc jockeys. Eventually Parker and Fara decided to record a studio-produced album. While doing so, Parker discovered she enjoyed working in the studio more than she enjoyed touring.

Co-founder, producer, and vice president of Comstock Records 
In 1978, Parker and husband, Fara, transitioned out of their traveling road show and into the record business. The team launched Comstock Records, and had an immediate charting hit with Canadian artist Alex Fraser. His (and their) first single, Four States to Go, reached #9 on the Canadian Country music charts. Parker and Fara soon discovered that artists from around the world were interested in recording authentic-sounding Country music songs. While the headquarters for Comstock Records was located in Shawnee, Kansas, Parker produced and recorded their music in top recording studios in Nashville, Tennessee. She worked with Nashville session musicians such as Tony Migliore, Ralph Childs, Sonny Garrish, Clyde Brooks, Mike Severs, and Don Roth, to provide artists with the authentic Nashville sound. In addition, Parker provided audio tapes and wrote lyrics phonetically to teach artists the country-western way of enunciating. Parker produced artists from many countries across the world including Australia, Canada, Croatia, Ireland, Sweden, Norway, Denmark, Belgium, the US, and elsewhere.

In 1988, Comstock moved to Scottdale, Arizona, but continued to record in Nashville. Parker and Fara also formed the subsidiary label, Paylode Records, for adult contemporary and Pop music. They also created two publishing companies, White Cat (ASCAP) and Rocky Bell (BMI).

Awards and recognition 
In 1985 Comstock artists were nominated for 10 Canadian Country Music Awards, including one for record company of the year. In 1986 five of Comstock records made the Cashbox Top 100. In 1989, Parker was named “Music Row’s Favorite Independent Female Record Producer” by Music Row magazine. Many of Comstock's artists achieved charting success and received Country music awards in their own countries. In 1998, Comstock Records was named Indie Record Label of the Year by the European Country Music Association (ECMA). Parker's success captured the attention of Billboard, Cashbox, The Wall Street Journal, CNN, and local newspapers and news stations across North America.

Legacy 
Many of Parker's recordings and much of Comstock's catalog now reside with independent record label, Fervor Records, which has placed many of their songs in TV and film.

Partial discography

As producer

As performing artist

Film and TV

References 

Living people
Singers from Kansas
American session musicians
Record producers from Kansas
Year of birth missing (living people)